Vibo Valentia-Pizzo railway station is the main railway station of the Italian city of Vibo Valentia, Calabria. It is part of the Battipaglia–Reggio di Calabria railway.

History 
The station was built during the late 1960s as part of the variant direttissima between Rosarno railway station and Lamezia Terme Centrale railway station. It was opened in 1972. Previously the city was served by the Vibo Marina  railway station, located in the frazione of the same name.

Layout 
The station has four tracks, two side platforms and one island platform, which are connected each other with an underpass. The station building features the waiting room, the ticket office, the ticket machine area and the toilet.

Services 
The station is served by regional trains operated by Trenitalia and also by:
 Frecciabianca service: Rome - Naples - Salerno - Lamezia Terme - Reggio di Calabria
 InterCity service: Rome - Naples - Salerno - Lamezia Terme - Reggio di Calabria
 InterCity service: Milan - Bologna - Florence - Rome - Naples - Salerno - Reggio di Calabria
 Intercity Notte service: Milan - Genoa - Pisa - Salerno - Lamezia Terme - Siracusa

References 

Railway stations in Calabria
Railway stations opened in 1972
1972 establishments in Italy
Railway stations in Italy opened in the 20th century